Hyposmocoma inflexa is a species of moth of the family Cosmopterigidae. It was first described by Thomas de Grey the 6th in 1907. It is endemic to the Hawaiian island of Maui.

External links

inflexa
Endemic moths of Hawaii